Squadron Leader Standish Conn O'Grady  (4 January 1888 – 7 May 1968) was an Irish flying ace of the First World War, credited with nine aerial victories. He returned to military service, serving as an instructor, during the Second World War. A civil engineer by profession, he later became a lecturer at Durham University.

Early life
O'Grady was born in Ireland on 4 January 1888, the third and youngest son of the journalist, historian and writer Standish James O'Grady (1846–1928) and his wife Margaret (née Fisher). He graduated from Trinity College, Dublin, in 1910 with Bachelor of Arts and Bachelor of Engineering degrees, and worked as a hydraulic engineer for the Congested Districts Board for Ireland before moving to Canada to work for the Department of the Interior's Dominion Water Power and Reclamation Service.

World War I
O'Grady was in Canada on the outbreak of war, eventually returning to England, where on 25 July 1916 he was commissioned as a second lieutenant (on probation) to serve in the Royal Flying Corps. He did his basic flight training with No. 7 Reserve Squadron in September and October 1916, and was appointed a flying officer on 31 October. His training continued as part of "C" Squadron at the Central Flying School, Upavon, Wiltshire, from October to December 1916, being confirmed in his rank on 17 November. He was with No. 8 Reserve Squadron from December 1916 to February 1917, then returned to "C" Squadron at the Central Flying School, in March 1917.

O'Grady was then posted to No. 23 Squadron RFC based at Baizieux, France, to fly the SPAD S.VII single-seat fighter, gaining his first aerial victory on 30 April. Further victories followed on 13 May and 24 June, and he was promoted to lieutenant on 1 August, and appointed a flight commander with the temporary rank of captain on 11 August. He gained six more victories by 26 August to bring his total to nine. He was then transferred to the Home Establishment in September 1917.

O'Grady was awarded the Military Cross on 25 September 1917. His citation, published on 9 January 1918, read:

Second Lieutenant Conn Standish O'Grady, Royal Flying Corps, Special Reserve.
"For conspicuous gallantly and devotion to duty in leading fighting patrols against superior numbers of enemy aircraft. He has himself brought down three enemy machines completely out of control, and others were seen to be destroyed, and his dash and determination when outnumbered by the enemy have continually won the highest praise."

O'Grady was transferred to the RAF's unemployed list on 24 May 1919.

List of aerial victories

Inter-war career
O'Grady returned to his pre-war career, initially working for Boving & Co. Ltd., before setting up as a consulting engineer. In 1931 he was appointed a lecturer in Civil Engineering at Armstrong College in Newcastle, part of Durham University.

O'Grady also retained his interest in flying, being granted a commission as a flying officer (Class "A") on probation in the General Duties Branch of the Reserve of Air Force Officers on 10 February 1925, and was confirmed in his rank on 10 August. He was promoted to flight lieutenant on 31 January 1928, but was transferred from Class "A" to Class "C" on 10 February 1933.

World War II
O'Grady returned to active service in the Reserve of Air Force Officers during the Second World War, serving as an instructor at No. 5 Air Observers Navigation School based at RAF Weston-super-Mare from May to August 1940, then at No. 45 Air School in Oudtshoorn, South Africa, from October 1941 to October 1943, also receiving promotion to the temporary rank of squadron leader on 24 July 1942. On 1 January 1944 he was awarded the Air Force Cross in the New Year Honours list. On 24 March 1944 he relinquished his commission and was permitted to retain the rank of squadron leader.

Post-war career
O'Grady returned to Durham in 1944 to become Senior Lecturer, eventually retiring in 1954. Outside of his profession O'Grady was also a keen fencer, yachtsman and mountaineer, but his primary interest was gliding. He was a member of both the Yorkshire and Newcastle Gliding Clubs, becoming chief flying instructor of the latter, and remained an active glider pilot into the 1950s. He was also an elected member of the Institution of Civil Engineers from 1919 until 1961.

Notes

References
Notes

Bibliography
 
 

1888 births
1968 deaths
O'Grady family
Alumni of Trinity College Dublin
Royal Flying Corps officers
Royal Air Force personnel of World War I
Irish World War I flying aces
Recipients of the Military Cross
Recipients of the Air Force Cross (United Kingdom)
Royal Air Force personnel of World War II
Academics of Durham University